Mulakunnathukavu  is part of Puzhakkal block, in Thrissur taluk, in Thrissur district. KILA is located here.

Transportation
Mulakunnathukavu railway station is located here.
SH 22 is the major road passing through

Education
 Kerala University of Health Sciences
 Kerala Institute of Local Administration
 Government Medical College, Thrissur
 Westfort Institute of Paramedical Science
 Institute of Management and Technology, Pottor

Etymology
The word "Mulakunnathukavu" can be broken down as, Mula-kunnathu-kavu.
 
In Malayalam it means ... 
mula => bamboo tree
kunnathu => atop a hill
kavu => temple

This translates to ...
"a temple atop a hill with bamboo trees"

There are different spellings of this panchayat, in various texts, and hence it is worth having a comprehensive list, of all the misspellings ...

Correct Spelling: Mulakunnathukavu

History
In ancient days it was then part of Vijayapuram "pravrithi" in Trichur "taluq".

Mulakunnathukavu Grama Panchayat was previously known as "Killannur Grama Panchayat"

Wards in the village
The group of villages forming the wards given in the table below are together governed by Mulakunnathukavu Grama Panchayat.
For the purposes of census, the area under Mulakunnathukavu Grama Panchayat comes under Killannur (CT).

References

Cities and towns in Thrissur district
Villages in Thrissur district